The Aschaff (in its uppermost course: Kleinaschaff) is a river in the northern Spessart in Bavaria, Germany.

It begins at the Aschaffquelle near Waldaschaff. Loosely translated the name Aschaff means "ash water". The largest tributary is the Laufach. The river flows mostly parallel to the Bundesautobahn 3 (Motorway). For the construction of the noise barrier there, the river bed was moved and straightened.

Now the Aschaff flows in the city of Aschaffenburg. It flows through the districts Damm and Strietwald. In Mainaschaff near the city limits of Aschaffenburg the Aschaff empties into the Main.

Tributaries 
Tributaries from source to mouth:

Left
 Bessenbach
 Nonnenbach
 Klingengraben
 Röderbach

Right
 Autenbach
 Gogelgraben
 Laufach
 Güntersbach
 Hösbach
 Goldbach	
 Klingenbach
 Glattbach
 Lohmgraben

References 

Rivers of Bavaria
Rivers of the Spessart
Aschaffenburg (district)
Aschaffenburg
Rivers of Germany